Mary Flaherty (born 17 May 1953) is a former Irish Fine Gael politician who served as Minister of State for Poverty and the Family from 1981 to 1982. She served a Teachta Dála (TD) for the Dublin North-West constituency from 1981 to 1997.

Before her entry into politics, she was a secondary school teacher. Flaherty was elected to the Dáil on her first attempt, at the 1981 general election, as a Fine Gael candidate in the Dublin North-West constituency.

That election saw Fine Gael return to power in a coalition government with the Labour Party, and on her first day in the Dáil Taoiseach Garret FitzGerald appointed Flaherty as Minister of State at the Department of Social Welfare. This was a junior post under Minister Eileen Desmond, but because Desmond's health was poor Flaherty often found herself bearing much of the responsibility for the department.

The government collapsed on 27 January 1982, when it lost a vote on the budget, and Flaherty left office when the new Fianna Fáil government was installed after the February 1982 general election. She later described her rapid promotion as having caused dissatisfaction amongst some older Fine Gael TDs who resented the rise of a 28-year-old woman.

Flaherty had been re-elected to the 23rd Dáil, and retained her seat through the next four general elections before losing it at the 1997 general election to Fianna Fáil's Pat Carey.

After leaving the Dáil, she became Chief Executive of the CARI Foundation, a voluntary organisation supporting children affected by child sexual abuse.

Mary Flaherty was married to former Fine Gael Senator and TD Alexis FitzGerald Jnr, who died on 15 July 2015.

See also
Families in the Oireachtas

References

1953 births
Living people
Fine Gael TDs
Irish schoolteachers
Local councillors in Dublin (city)
Members of the 22nd Dáil
Members of the 23rd Dáil
Members of the 24th Dáil
Members of the 25th Dáil
Members of the 26th Dáil
Members of the 27th Dáil
20th-century women Teachtaí Dála
Ministers of State of the 22nd Dáil
Politicians from County Dublin
Spouses of Irish politicians
Women ministers of state of the Republic of Ireland
Alumni of University College Dublin